A sopka is a monumental tumulus resembling a kurgan, referring specifically to those built by the Novgorodian Sopka cultures of the Early Middle Ages.

The Peredolian sopka is a famous example of a sopka.

References

History of Veliky Novgorod
Tumuli
Archaeological sites in Russia